Rafi Muhammad Chaudhry FPAS HI, NI, SI, Skdt (1 July 1903 – 4 December 1988) best known as R. M. Chaudhry, was a Pakistani nuclear physicist and a professor of particle physics at the Government College University. His teaching and instructions on modern physics influenced many of his student to pursue career in physics who regard him as one of the key architects of having been the pioneer of experimental nuclear physics research in Pakistan

and, along with Abdus Salam and Ishrat Hussain Usmani, one of the main creators of Pakistan's nuclear weapons research program in the 1970s. Chaudhry, who served as professor of nuclear physics at Government College University, was later referred to by Dr. Samar Mubarakmand, one of his students, as "the true father of the nuclear weapons program of Pakistan".

Early life and education
Chaudhry was born in 1903 to a middle-class Rajput family (Rao) in Kahnaur, a small village in Rohtak district of Eastern Punjab. He passed the university entrance exam with highest marks and earned a scholarship awarded by the Viceroy Rufus Isaacs, 1st Marquess of Reading. He used the scholarship to enroll as a student of chemical engineering at Aligarh University in 1923, but after taking an engineering physics course, he decided to change his focus to thermodynamics and multivariable calculus. He was successful as a physics student, earning the respect of his peers and professors.

In 1927, Chaudhry took his BSc in Experimental physics, followed by his 1929 MSc in physics with First Class Honours. The same year, Chaudhry gained attention from Hamidullah Khan, the Nawab of Bhopal of princely state of Bhopal, who awarded him a science scholarship for higher studies. Under that scholarship, Chaudhry travelled to United Kingdom to study for his doctoral degree. Chaudhry joined the Cavendish Laboratory of the University of Cambridge. At Cambridge, Chaudhry studied Calculus of mathematical Integrals, and learned Tensor calculus, quantum physics, and general relativity under Nobel laureate in Chemistry Ernest Rutherford.
At Cavendish, he studied with Mark Oliphant, who particularly influenced him to study nuclear physics. Chaudhry and Oliphant carried out research in artificial disintegration of the atomic nucleus and positive ions. In 1933, Chaudhry earned his D.Phil in Nuclear physics under Ernest Rutherford. He then returned to India.

Professorship in Europe
At age 30, Chaudhry moved to Lahore and took an academic professorship in physics at the Lahore Islamia College. In 1935, he became Chairman of Department of Physics there, remaining in that position until 1938. In 1938, Chaudhry moved back to Aligarh Muslim University (AMU) to teach physics, again becoming head of his department. In 1944, Chaudhry was contacted by Mark Oliphant, who offered him an opportunity to return to the Cavendish Laboratory. In response, Chaudhry moved to United Kingdom, where he joined Oxford University's Nuffield College and was appointed a Nuffield Fellow. Along with Oliphant and Homi J. Bhabha, Chaudhry created a group of physicists that did research in theories of Gamma and Beta decay, as well as researching the neutrino—postulated by Wolfgang Pauli in 1930—Compton scattering, and the behaviour of slow neutrons during the atomic bombardment process.

On the recommendation of Oliphant, Chaudhry joined Atomic Energy Research Establishment to continue research in nuclear physics. There, he established a laboratory to conduct research in nuclear power plants. He applied his research work to the behaviour of slow neutrons in research nuclear reactors and set about identifying the heavier particles emitted by alpha decay and alpha decay's extension to the Cluster decay.

Return to India

In 1948, months after the independence of Pakistan, while in Great Britain, he was contacted by Indian Premier Jawaharlal Nehru. Nehru offered him a senior position at the Physics Laboratory of India. Chaudhry consulted mentor Mark Oliphant about the offer, and Oliphant wrote letters to Founder of Pakistan Muhammad Ali Jinnah, Governor-General. The letter encouraged Jinnah to engage his country in research in nuclear technology, particularly nuclear physics. According to Oliphant, no other Muslim scientist was available in the South Asia except Dr. Chaudhary who could prove useful for the newly born country in the field of Nuclear Technology. However, Nehru learned of this development, and personally offered him a position of "Deputy Directorship" of Physics Laboratory of India.

While Chaudhry was considering the offers, Jinnah sent him a letter where Jinnah had personally requested him to come to Pakistan, and join Government College University. Despite a personal phone call from Nehru urging him to come to India, Chaudhry chose the Pakistani position. In 1948, Rafi Muhammad Chaudhry migrated to Pakistan and joined Government College University as head of the Physics Department and a professor of nuclear physics.

Pakistan
Following his settlement in Pakistan, the Government of Pakistan asked him to engage research in physics at the Government College University. In 1952, Chaudhry established the "High Tension Laboratory" (now "Centre for Advanced Studies in Physics") as an offshoot of the Physics Department at Government College. Chaudhry was an instrumental figure in the installation of the 1.2 MeV Cockcroft-Walton accelerator in the High Tension Laboratory (HTL) in 1954 for carrying out basic research in atomic and nuclear physics. Chaudhry led projects that investigated fundamental problems of physics concerning gaseous diffusion, ion and electron impact phenomena, nuclear physics, radioactivity, and cosmic rays. The research carried out at the laboratory resulted in research publications in Nature and it was visited by the Prince Philip, Duke of Edinburgh in 1958. At HTL, Chaudhry influenced many physicists who studied under him, such as N. M. Butt and Samar Mubarakmand, Abdul Majid who became the senior scientists in Pakistan's indigenous nuclear and space development. After retirement from Government College, Lahore in 1958 he continued as Director of High Tension Laboratory until 1965.

Pakistan Atomic Energy Commission

In 1960, Chaudhry joined the Pakistan Atomic Energy Commission, where he engaged nuclear technology research. He was the first director of the Pakistan Institute of Nuclear Science and Technology (PINSTECH), and was instrumental in the installation of nuclear particle accelerator there. Chaudhry published 42 research papers while at PINSTECH, and due to the sensitivity of the work, the papers were highly classified. Chaudhry was an administrative and influential figure in the establishment of PARR-I reactor as well, as being part team that supervised the first reactor criticality at PINSTECH. In 1967, Rafi supervised the team of scientists at PINSTECH that successfully produced the first batch of radioisotopes.

1971 war and atomic bomb project
In 1968, Chaudhry went to United States with a fellowship awarded by University of California at Berkeley. There, he was joined by Hafeez Qureshi, a mechanical engineer who built weapons in the 1970s. In 1969, Chaudhry moved to the University of Chicago where he did his research at Argonne National Laboratory (ANL). In 1970, Chaudhry and Qureshi visited the National Museum of the United States Air Force where they saw the actual design of Fat Man – an implosion device built during the World War II.

In 1971, after the Indo-Pakistani War of 1971, Chaudhry returned to Pakistan and joined Government College University. In January 1972, Chaudhry represented the HTL's delegation at the Multan Meeting, convened by Zulfikar Ali Bhutto. During the meeting, Chaudhry spoke, as he said: I was perhaps the only one among the scientists who had seen an actual atom bomb. Chaudhry was immediately posted at PINSTECH institute, where he was made director of Radiation Physics Division (RPD). Chaudhry was among the senior scientists that built the first nuclear pile PARR-II reactor at Pinstech. Under Chaudhry, the RPD scientists engaged in research in radiation physics.

Post career
In 1973, Rafi moved back to High Tension Laboratory at GCU Lahore. In 1975, he joined the Centre for Solid State Physics at the Punjab University and continued to work there as an honorary Professor; he was made Professor Emeritus in 1977. Chaudhry died peacefully at the age of 85 in Lahore.

Recognition and honours
Chaudhry was an influential figure at the Government College University and his work in PAEC and PINSTECH has been far reaching. In 1998, on personal recommendation of Noor Muhammad Butt, the Government of Pakistan awarded him Nishan-e-Imtiaz – the first high civil award. In 2004, the "High Tension Laboratory (HTL)" was renamed as "Rafi Chaudhry High Tension Laboratory" by the then-President of Pakistan, General Pervez Musharaff in the honour of Chaudhry. Due to his work, scientists at PINSTECH named him the "Father of the Pakistan's nuclear weapons programme".

Family of physicists
Dr Rafi had nine children, all of whom became physicists. The most distinguished ones are Dr. Anwar Chaudhri, currently working in Germany, and Dr. Munawar Chaudhri, working at the Cavendish Laboratory, Cambridge, UK.

Awards
Hilal-i-Imtiaz(2004)
Nishan-e-Imtiaz (1998)
Sitara-i-Imtiaz (1965)
Sitara-i-Khidmat (1954)

Institutes named after Rafi Muhammad Chaudhry
 Rafi Chaudhry High Tension Laboratory, Government College University

References

1903 births
Pakistani physicists
Pakistani scientists
Pakistani scholars
Pakistani nuclear physicists
Aligarh Muslim University alumni
Alumni of the University of Cambridge
Project-706 people
1988 deaths
Fellows of Nuffield College, Oxford
Fellows of Pakistan Academy of Sciences
Indian emigrants to Pakistan
Nuclear weapons scientists and engineers